The Great Synagogue is an Orthodox Jewish congregation located in a large heritage-listed synagogue at 187a Elizabeth Street in the Sydney central business district in the City of Sydney in New South Wales, Australia.

The congregation is the oldest in the Sydney Jewish community, and comprises around 550 families. There are services every day of the week with the exception of Sunday. The service is Orthodox and traditional, with a professional choir singing on Shabbat and Festival mornings and at some evening services.

The synagogue provides pastoral care, adult education, a conversion class, activities for children and families and is the location for important Jewish communal services and events. Its Chief Minister is traditionally regarded as a primary representative of Judaism to the wider community.

Situated opposite Hyde Park, the synagogue building extends to Castlereagh Street. It was designed by Thomas Rowe and constructed between 1874 and 1878, with the stonework done by Aaron Loveridge and stone carving by Thomas Wran. The synagogue was added to the New South Wales State Heritage Register on 10 September 2004. The building is also listed on the (now defunct) Register of the National Estate.

History 
The Great Synagogue was built to unite two Jewish congregations in Sydney which worshiped at the time in synagogues in York Street and Macquarie Street. The York Street Synagogue had been designed in the Egyptian Revival style by James Hume and built in 1844. The first moves were made in 1864 towards obtaining a suitable site for a newer, larger synagogue.

In 1871 a meeting was held at York Street to discuss buying land available in Elizabeth Street. It was suggested a meeting be held with the Macquarie Street Synagogue to unite in purchasing the land for a synagogue to serve the whole community. The proposal was for a synagogue and educational facilities. The money was to be raised by sale of land in Kent Street which had been granted for a Jewish school but never used. Further money was raised by the sale of the York and Macquarie Street properties. An appeal was also launched to fund the new building, accompanied by a photograph of the Central Synagogue in London (opening in 1870 and destroyed by bombing in 1941) which was intended to serve as the model for the Sydney building. Thomas Rowe, a Cornish architect based in Sydney, was selected in 1872 by means of a limited competition, the other competitors being George Allen Mansfield and Benjamin Backhouse; Rowe also acted as the construction manager for the new building. The building of the synagogue was partly based on the Princes Road Synagogue, Liverpool. The foundation stone was laid in January 1875 by Saul Samuel, Postmaster General, the first Jewish minister of the Crown in the British Empire. A bazaar was held by the women of the congregation in Martin Place in December 1875 to raise extra funds.

The principal contractor for stonework was Aaron Loveridge, founder of the modern firm of Loveridge & Hudson. The contract drawings by Rowe, and signed by Loveridge, are held by Sydney's Mitchell Library. Other notable firms connected with the work were William Coleman (carpentry and joinery), Fletcher Brothers (decorative cast iron), Lewis and Steel (decorative plaster), Cornelius and Co of Philadelphia (gas fixtures), Minton Hollins & Co (tiles), P. N. Russell & Co (cast iron columns), and Lyon & Cottier (stained and etched glass).

The synagogue was consecrated on 4 March 1878, but its decoration was not completed until 1883. At the time of completion the synagogue was one of the first large Victorian buildings erected in Sydney.

The Great Synagogue possesses records of births, marriages and deaths which have taken place since the first entry was made on 1 November 1826. It also houses the AM Rosenblum Museum and the Falk Library, where weekday services take place.

In 1988 the Bicentennial Council of NSW recognised the importance of the building and recommended a significant grant for restoration work on the Elizabeth Street façade.

Architecture 
The Great Synagogue combines elements of Byzantine style and Gothic characteristics. The building is often described as the "cathedral synagogue" of Australia.

The Great Synagogue consists of two main sections: the original synagogue (house of worship) with a ladies' gallery, at the Elizabeth Street end, and a five-storey modern section at the Castlereagh Street end behind the facade of the original Beadle's residence. The original eclectic design in Victorian Free Gothic style was described at the time of consecration as Byzantine interspersed with Gothic elements. The Elizabeth Street frontage and towers are of Pyrmont stone, and the remainder of the early structure is brick with cast-iron columns and timber floors, and a slate roof. The Castlereagh Street facade is stone at ground floor level, with rendered brickwork above. 

The interior is decorated with moulded plaster, carved timber and stained glass, all embellished with abstract patterns to avoid representation of living forms. Surviving timber stairs at the Elizabeth Street end have strongly carved balustrades. Walls are painted with gold leaf highlights, and the furniture is mostly of polished timber and brass. Some original colour schemes survive, notably on the ceiling of the Elizabeth Street porch, while the midnight blue ceiling with gold leaf stars has been repainted to the original design several times. Timber floors are raked at both ground and gallery levels, and the centre section of the ground floor and Ark steps, like the porch, are tiled in tessellated and mosaic work. The basement contains a hall which has steel portal frames supporting the columns and floor above, and also contains the A M Rosenblum Museum and Rabbi Falk Library. The modern section, constructed of reinforced concrete, contains offices, classrooms & meeting rooms, together with a lift & fire stairs, and has a top floor with an openable roof. The modern stained glass windows in the Castlereagh Street facade were designed by Louis Kahan of Melbourne. The building contains examples of venerable sacred scrolls and religious artefacts, including a menorah (nine-branched candelabrum) made by Rabbi L. A. Falk.

The present synagogue has the traditional feature of an elevated ladies' gallery. When first erected, the bimah was central, as is traditional. However, to increase seating capacity the bimah was moved forward to the western wall in 1906. Over the years, extensive additions and alterations have been made to the other facilities appurtenant to this building, including the construction of a succah, excavation and construction of a large reception area below the synagogue itself, construction of the Rabbi Falk Memorial Library, installation of electricity in the chandeliers, and installation of a shabbat elevator. A useful overview of the synagogue's history is provided by the 2008 book edited by Rabbi Raymond Apple.

Condition 

As at 22 August 2001, the condition of the building is generally good, although the upper sections of stonework require maintenance (1997). There is unlikely to be much archaeological potential owing to the excavations for new sections of the building in the 1950s and 1980s.

The Great Synagogue is generally intact both externally and internally in the older section fronting Elizabeth Street.

Modifications and dates 
1907 - Bimah moved from the centre to the west end of the synagogue and seats placed in the empty central area. Architects Kent & Budden.
1911choir gallery moved from east to west end, western semi-circular apse made square.
1910sgasoliers converted to electric light. Little intrusion.
1940seastern wheel window strengthened internally with reinforced concrete. Some intrusion internally.
1957basement deepened and reconstructed as War Memorial Hall. Architect Orwell Phillips. Some intrusion, although the previous basement area appears to have been of little significance.
1981western section rebuilt behind original facade as Education Centre. Architects Orwell Phillips and David Nathan. Some intrusion mostly in less significant areas, except for the replacement of original timber stairs with concrete fire stairs.
1987stonework conserved and interiors decorated with stencilling, some based on early patterns found. Sprinkler system installed. Minimal intrusion.

Further information 

One of the State significant items used at the launch of the State Heritage Inventory.

June 2006: more than $310,000 approved to assist works to the interior - The project includes: restoration works to the interior of the building, reintroduction of natural ventilation, and conservation work to the suspended and wall-mounted gasoliers.

People 
Rev Alexander B Davis was the Chief Minister of the York Street Synagogue beginning in 1862 and became the first Chief Minister of The Great Synagogue in 1878 until his retirement in 1903.

In 1905 Rabbi Francis Lyon Cohen was appointed Rabbi of The Great Synagogue and charged with establishing a Beth Din in Sydney, which still exists today. From 1909 he was assisted by Rev Marcus Einfeld as Cantor and from 1922 by Rev (later Rabbi) LA Falk as Second Rabbi. Rabbi Falk served until his death in 1957, leaving an important library.

Cohen died in office in 1934 and was succeeded briefly by Rabbi Ernest Levy. Rabbi Dr. Israel Porush was appointed Rabbi in 1940. Porush was born in Jerusalem, and educated in there and in Germany. He was living in London when he met his wife Bertha Link. Porush became the most senior rabbi in Australia and retired in 1972.

From 1973 to 2005 Rabbi Raymond Apple led the congregation and made several changes to the synagogue, including introducing the priestly blessing on festivals, instituting a male choir and enabling the first individual bat mitzvah on a Shabbat morning.

The cantor from 1964 to 1989 was Rev Isidor Gluck, who guided the service towards a less English and more Eastern European style, while maintaining its cantorial and choral nature.

Rabbi Jeremy Lawrence was rabbi from 2005 to 2014 and was very involved with interfaith work. In 2015 he was succeeded by the present Chief Minister, Rabbi Dr Benjamin Elton. Rabbi Elton is also the Orthodox Rabbinic Consultant to the Executive Council of Australian Jewry and the New South Wales Jewish Board of Deputies. 

Presidents of The Great Synagogue have included George Myers, George Judah Cohen, Israel Green, Sidney Sinclair AM OBE Life President, Rosalind Fischl, Stephen Rothman, and currently David Lewis.

Gallery

See also

 History of the Jews in Australia
 List of synagogues in Australia and New Zealand

References

Bibliography

Attribution

External links 

 
 The Great Syngagogue of Sydney
 A history of the Great Synagogue, Sydney
 Great Synagogue rabbis and the British Chief Rabbinate
  [CC-By-SA]

Jewish Australian history
Orthodox synagogues in Australia
Synagogues in Sydney
Synagogues completed in 1878
New South Wales State Heritage Register
Thomas Rowe buildings
Articles incorporating text from the New South Wales State Heritage Register
Elizabeth Street, Sydney
1878 establishments in Australia
Byzantine Revival synagogues
Gothic Revival synagogues